Jordon Graham John Brown (born 10 February 1994) is an English-born Hong Kong professional footballer who currently plays as a left back for Hong Kong Premier League club Kitchee.

Club career
On 12 July 2022, it was announced that Brown had joined Kitchee.

Personal life
Born and raised in England, Brown came to Hong Kong in 2010 at the age of 16. He later started his career at HKFC.

On 19 November 2022, Brown officially announced that he had received a Hong Kong passport after giving up his British passport, making him eligible to represent Hong Kong internationally.

Career statistics

Club

Notes

References

Living people
1994 births
English footballers
Hong Kong footballers
English expatriate footballers
Naturalized footballers of Hong Kong
Association football defenders
Hong Kong First Division League players
Hong Kong Premier League players
Hong Kong FC players
Resources Capital FC players
Kitchee SC players
English expatriate sportspeople in Hong Kong
Expatriate footballers in Hong Kong